Ras-related protein Rab-2A is a protein that in humans is encoded by the RAB2A gene.

Function 

Members of the Rab protein family are nontransforming monomeric GTP-binding proteins of the Ras superfamily that contain 4 highly conserved regions involved in GTP binding and hydrolysis. Rabs are prenylated, membrane-bound proteins involved in vesicular fusion and trafficking. The mammalian RAB proteins show striking similarities to the S. cerevisiae YPT1 and SEC4 proteins, Ras-related GTP-binding proteins involved in the regulation of secretion.[supplied by OMIM]

Interactions 

RAB2A has been shown to interact with GOLGA2.

References

Further reading